Stenoglene obtusus is a moth in the family Eupterotidae. It was described by Francis Walker in 1864. It is found in Burundi, the Democratic Republic of the Congo (East Kasai, Katanga), Kenya, Malawi, Mozambique, South Africa (Gauteng, KwaZulu-Natal), Tanzania and Zimbabwe.

Description
The wingspan is about 45 mm. The forewings are fulvous with almost obliterated transverse linear fasciae, the first practically obsolete and not anteriorly recurved, the second a little more distinct. The hindwings are croceous (deep reddish yellow) without black spots on the abdominal area.

References

Moths described in 1864
Janinae
Moths of Sub-Saharan Africa